Saint-Léger (also unofficial Saint-Léger-en-Gaume) is a municipality of Wallonia located in the province of Luxembourg, Belgium.

On 1 January 2007 the municipality, which covers 35.86 km2, had 3,225 inhabitants, giving a population density of 89.9 inhabitants per km2.

The municipality consists of the districts of Châtillon, Meix-le-Tige, and Saint-Léger.

References

External links
 

 
Municipalities of Luxembourg (Belgium)